Thirumittacode is a gram panchayat in the Pattambi taluk, Palakkad district, state of Kerala, India. It is a local government organisation that serves the villages of Thirumittacode-I and Thirumittacode-II.

See also 

 Thirumittacode inscription

References 

Gram panchayats in Palakkad district